Nevyansky District is an administrative district (raion), one of the thirty in Sverdlovsk Oblast, Russia. Its administrative center is the town of Nevyansk. Population (excluding the administrative center): 22,833 (2010 Census);

Administrative and municipal status
Within the framework of administrative divisions, Nevyansky District is one of the thirty in the oblast. The town of Nevyansk serves as its administrative center.

As a municipal division, the territory of the district is split between two municipal formations—Nevyansky Urban Okrug, to which the town of Nevyansk and thirty-seven of the administrative district's rural localities belong, and Verkh-Neyvinsky Urban Okrug, which covers the rest of the administrative district's territory, including the work settlement of Verkh-Neyvinsky.

References

Notes

Sources

Districts of Sverdlovsk Oblast
